ASK Dragão is an Angolan sports club from the province of Uíge.

ASK stands for Atlético Sport Kalonji.

In 2017, the team qualified to the Gira Angola, the qualifying tournament for Angola's top division, the Girabola.

League & Cup Positions

Managers
 Carlos Azulinho (2017)
 Nicolau Bodó (2018)

Players

References

Football clubs in Angola
Sports clubs in Angola